Kévin Fortuné (born 6 August 1989) is a professional footballer who plays as a forward for  club Orléans and the Martinique national team.

Early life
Fortuné was born in the 17th arrondissement of Paris, France but his family originated from the department of Martinique, making him eligible to play for their national team.

Club career

Troyes
On 31 August 2018, the last day of the 2018 summer transfer window, Fortuné joined Ligue 1 side Troyes AC from Ligue 2 club RC Lens signing a three-year contract.

Tractor
On 22 August 2019, Fortuné joined Tractor S.C. after an undisclosed fee was agreed between Troyes AC and the Iranian club.

Media reports indicate that there was a high transfer fee involved and considering Fortuné’s annual income the deal was unprecedented in Iranian football and Fortuné becomes one of the highest earning players in the Persian Gulf Pro League.

Auxerre
In May 2020, after being released by Tractor, Fortuné agreed a two-year contract with AJ Auxerre.

Orléans
On 22 June 2022, Fortuné moved to Orléans.

International career
He made his debut for the Martinique national football team in a 1–0 2019–20 CONCACAF Nations League qualifying win over Puerto Rico on 13 October 2018. On 7 June 2019, he was named to Martinique's squad for the 2019 CONCACAF Gold Cup.

On 18 July 2021, Fortuné scored the 1,000th CONCACAF Gold Cup goal against Haiti in a 2–1 loss in the 2021 CONCACAF Gold Cup competition.

Career statistics

International goals
Scores and results list Martinique's goal tally first, score column indicates score after each Fortuné goal.

References

1989 births
Living people
Footballers from Paris
Association football forwards
Martiniquais footballers
Martinique international footballers
2019 CONCACAF Gold Cup players
2021 CONCACAF Gold Cup players
French footballers
French people of Martiniquais descent
Ligue 2 players
Championnat National players
Championnat National 2 players
Championnat National 3 players
Persian Gulf Pro League players
US Albi players
FC Martigues players
AS Béziers (2007) players
RC Lens players
ES Troyes AC players
Tractor S.C. players
AJ Auxerre players
LB Châteauroux players
US Orléans players
Martiniquais expatriate footballers
Expatriate footballers in Iran
Martiniquais expatriate sportspeople in Iran